Jaora State was a 13 gun-salute princely state of the British Raj. It was part of the Malwa Agency.

Jaora state was divided into four tehsils, Jaora, Barauda, Tal, and Barkhera. The chief crops were millets, cotton, maize and opium. The revenue of the state was Rs.8,50,000 in 1901.

History
Jaora State was established by the British and was handed over to Abdul Ghafur Muhammad Khan in 1818, so that he can maintain an army of 1,000 soldiers for the East India Company. Abdul Ghafur Khan's family was settled in Uttar Pradesh/Hindustan before migrating to Rajasthan, while they traced their ancestors to the Tajik tribe of Swat. 'Abdu'l Ghafur Muhammad Khan was a cavalry officer serving the Rohilla leader Muhammad Amir Khan Pindari of Sambhal, Uttar Pradesh. He later served the Holkar maharaja of Indore State. The state was confirmed by the British government in 1818 by the Treaty of Mandsaur. The Nawab of Jaora was confirmed the possession of Jaora, Sanjit, Tal, Malhargarh, Bharauda and the right to levy tribute from Piploda. The Nawab was expected to serve the British by providing them with 500 horsemen, 500 footmen and 4 artillery whenever required. Most of the soldiers and population of the Jaora State came from United Provinces of Agra and Oudh region of Hindustan. One of his fellow soldiers, Mir Zafar Ali, was an Indian Muslim of the Sadaat-e-Bara tribe, born in the Bahera village of the Fatehpur Haswa in Oudh. He gained Bilaud in the Sanjit Pargana as his jagir.

Nawab Muhammad Ismail (ruled 1865-1895) was an honorary major in the British Army. During the reign of Nawab Muhammad Iftekhar Ali Khan (ruled 1895-1947), Piploda became a separate state in 1924, and Panth-Piploda became a province of British India in 1942. Nawab Muhammad Usman 'Ali Khan (ruled 1947-1948) acceded to the Government of India on 15 June 1948.

Jagirdars of Jaora
The chieftains of several petty estates who once paid tribute to Amir Khan Pindari and the other surrounding powers came under the suzerainty of Jaora State after the Treaty of Mandsaur. The Jagirdars were mostly Rajputs apart from Bilaud and Numan Nagdi who were Pathans and Barha Sayyids and Sidri whose thakur was a Mahajan.

See also
Central India Agency
Political integration of India
Hussain Tekri
Pathans of Madhya Pradesh

References

External links 

Jaora State 2 paisa coin other side, year 1893

Princely states of Madhya Pradesh
Muslim princely states of India
States and territories disestablished in 1948
1817 establishments in India
1948 disestablishments in India
Pashtun dynasties
Ratlam district